Communist Party of Pakistan is a political party in Pakistan led by Khadim Thaheem. It was formed through a split away from the Communist Party of Pakistan in 2002. Thaheem is the general secretary of the party. Rauf Korai is the Sindh Committee secretary of the party.

External links
Party website

References

2002 establishments in Pakistan
Communist parties in Pakistan
Communist Party of Pakistan
Political parties established in 2002